Murray County was one of the original Nineteen Counties in New South Wales and is now one of the 141 Lands administrative divisions of New South Wales. It included the area which is now part of Canberra and as far north as Lake George and Yass. It was originally bounded on the west by the Murrumbidgee River, on the east by the Shoalhaven River and on the north by the Yass River. A large area of the county was transferred to the Commonwealth government in 1909 in the Seat of Government Acceptance Act to make part of the Australian Capital Territory, along with land in Cowley County. Since then, the ACT border is now part of the western boundary. Part of the ACT border is determined by property boundaries in the Parish of Keewong, in the County of Murray; specifically the southern end of portions 177, 218, 211, 36, and 38. This is mentioned in the Seat of Government Acceptance Act of 1909.

Murray County is named in honour of Lieutenant-Governor, Sir George Murray (1772–1846). The electoral district of United Counties of Murray and St Vincent was the first electoral district for the area, between 1856 and 1859.

Parishes within this county
The four parishes of Canberra, Yarrolumla, Narrabundah and Gigerline became part of the Australian Capital Territory in 1911. Some of the other parishes are smaller than they were in the nineteenth century, due to land being taken out of them for the ACT; this includes Tuggeranong, Queanbeyan, Amungula, Pialligo, Goorooyarroo, Ginninderra and Weetangera.

Alterations to parishes on the ACT/NSW border, listed clockwise from the north-west:

 Nearly all of the Parish of Weetangera becomes part of the ACT except for the small section near Ginninderra falls at 
 About half of the Parish of Ginninderra joins the ACT (including Hall)
 A minuscule portion of the Parish of Bedulluck joins the ACT, near the northern tip of the territory.
 Two non-continuous parts of the Parish of Goorooyarroo join the ACT, which make up about two fifths of the parish area in total. (Northern Gungahlin area)
 About a quarter of the Parish of Majura becomes part of the ACT, this leaves a tiny area separate from the main part of the parish, at 
 A small section of the Parish of Carwoola becomes part of the ACT, this is located between the Molonglo River and the Goulburn-Queanbeyan railway line at 
 About half of the Parish of Queanbeyan joins the ACT (modern Fyshwick Hume)
 A small portion of the Parish of Keewong which is to the east of the Murrumbidgee River at  joins the ACT.

Parish list
A full list of parishes found within this county (including the four former parishes of Canberra, Yarrolumla, Narrabundah and Gigerline which are now wholly in the ACT ); their current LGA and mapping coordinates to the approximate centre of each location is as follows:

References

External links
 A map of the County of Murray, Baker's Australian county atlas. 1843-1846
 Map of Murray county. W. & F. Ford, 1848

Counties of New South Wales